The Kingdom of Tonga was a protected state of the United Kingdom from 1900 to 1970, when its protectorate status was removed.

History

Tonga became a British protected state under a Treaty of Friendship on 18 May 1900, when European settlers and rival Tongan chiefs tried to oust the second King. The Treaty of Friendship and protected state status ended in 1970 under arrangements established prior to her death by the third monarch, Queen Sālote.

An unspoken agreement of the treaty that was common in British protected states was a new British monopoly on Tonga's thriving vanilla industry, and their small deposits of minerals.

On 18 May 1900, to discourage German advances, the Kingdom of Tonga became a Protected State with the United Kingdom under a Treaty of Friendship signed by George Tupou II after European settlers and rival Tongan chiefs attempted to overthrow him. 
Foreign affairs of the Kingdom of Tonga were conducted through the British Consul. The United Kingdom had veto power over foreign policies and finances of the Kingdom of Tonga.

Tonga was affected by the 1918 flu pandemic, with 1,800 Tongans killed, around eight per cent of the residents.

For most of the 20th century Tonga was quiet, inward-looking, and somewhat isolated from developments elsewhere in the world. Tonga's complex social structure is essentially broken into three tiers: the King, the nobles, and the commoners. Between the nobles and commoners are Matapule, sometimes called "talking chiefs," who are associated with the King or a noble and who may or may not hold estates. Obligations and responsibilities are reciprocal, and although the nobility are able to extract favours from people living on their estates, they likewise must extend favours to their people. Status and rank play a powerful role in personal relationships, even within families.

On 4 June 1970, protected state status of the Kingdom of Tonga ended. The end of the Kingdom of Tonga protected state status was arraigned by Salote Tupou III prior to her death in 1965.

Tonga remains a member state of the Commonwealth of Nations.

Gallery

References

History of Tonga
British Western Pacific Territories
Former British colonies and protectorates in Oceania
Tonga
Tonga
1900 establishments in the British Empire
1970 disestablishments in the British Empire
1900 establishments in Oceania
1970 disestablishments in Oceania
20th century in Tonga
States and territories established in 1900
States and territories disestablished in 1970
Tonga and the Commonwealth of Nations
United Kingdom and the Commonwealth of Nations